"You Know What I Need" is a song by Australian electronic trio Pnau and Australian singer Troye Sivan, released through Etcetc on 2 December 2022.

In a statement, PNAU's Nick Littlemore said "Working with Troye again has been amazing. When we wrote this song, we had no idea that we will get so lucky to have Troye Sivan singing and bringing his unbridled creativity to the world of PNAU." Sivan said "I'm so happy this song is coming out just before the Australian summer, it sounds like a beach festival to me, and I am stoked to have it out."

The song comes paired with an immersive video from Polish creatives MELT, that transforms a cell phone-recorded video of Sivan into an outer space. The trippy psychedelic visual are, according to video producer Kuba Matka, inspired by the stargate sequence from 2001: A Space Odyssey.

Critical reception
Tyler Jenke from Music Feeds called the song a "summery pop anthem" that "places PNAUs eclectic electronic instrumentation alongside Sivan's soaring vocals."

Greta Brereton from NME called it "a fitting blend of Sivan's easygoing pop and the energetic dance music PNAU are known for, with smatterings of upbeat synth, catchy production and soaring vocals".

Politica Mente Corretto "Troye's enveloping falsetto ties into the immediacy and elegance of PNAU's sound, making 'You Know What I Need' a perfect combination of radio pop and modern disco groove."

Joost Landzaat from Nieuweplaat said "The track is reminiscent of the music Years & Years and is about not being able to live without someone, but also not being able to be with them."

Charts

References

2022 singles
2022 songs
Pnau songs
Animated music videos
Troye Sivan songs
Songs written by Kevin Garrett (musician)
Songs written by Nick Littlemore
Songs written by Peter Mayes
Songs written by Sam Littlemore
Songs written by Troye Sivan